Edelgard, also Adalgard, Edelgart, or Ethelgard, is a female given name of German origin, now rare. In Old High German, it combines the words for "noble" (adal, modern German edel) and "guard" (gard).

Persons of this name include:

People
Edelgard Bulmahn, German politician 
Edelgard Huber von Gersdorff, German supercentenarian
Edelgard Gräfer, a member of the German Red Army Faction terrorist group
Edelgard Mahant, Canadian academic

Fictional characters
Edelgard von Hresvelg, from the video games Fire Emblem: Three Houses and Fire Emblem Warriors: Three Hopes
Edelgard, from the light novel series How Not to Summon a Demon Lord

References